The Ex is a 1997 erotic thriller film directed by Mark L. Lester and starring Yancy Butler and Suzy Amis. It is based on the 1996 novel by John Lutz. The film was released on direct-to-video in the United States on April 22, 1997.

Premise
Deidre Kenyon (Yancy Butler) is David Kenyon's (Nick Mancuso) ex-wife and intends to stalk him and wreck his family. She goes to extreme lengths to do this.

Cast

Production
Filming took place in Vancouver and Richmond, British Columbia as well as Toronto, Ontario.

References

External links

Canadian erotic thriller films
1997 direct-to-video films
1997 crime thriller films
1990s English-language films
Films based on American novels
Films shot in Vancouver
Films directed by Mark L. Lester
American independent films
American direct-to-video films
Canadian independent films
English-language Canadian films
Canadian direct-to-video films
1997 films
Films with screenplays by Larry Cohen
1990s American films
1990s Canadian films